"Seul" is the name of a 2000 song recorded by the Canadian singer Garou. It was released on October 2000 as the first single from his debut album, Seul, on which it features as the fourth track. It achieved a smash success in France and Belgium (Wallonia) where it topped the charts for three months, and was a top ten hit in Switzerland. To date, it is his most successful solo single (Garou has other #1 in duets and a trio).

Background and performances
The song was written by the songwriter Luc Plamondon, who also wrote "Belle" about two years before, composed by Romano Musumarra who also composed several hits for various artists such as Elsa Lunghini, Jeanne Mas and Princess Stéphanie of Monaco and produced by Erick Benzi, who also participated in the 1995 two hits of Céline Dion.

The song was also performed on Garou's 2001 concert and was thus included on his live album Seul... avec vous, as 13th track. It features on many French compilations, such as Hits France 2001, NRJ Music Awards 2002, and was also the second track on Garou's 2006 single, "L'Injustice".

Chart performance
"Seul" had a huge success in France. It entered the chart in low positions on 23 December 2000, jumped quickly and reached number one three week later. It stayed there for eleven weeks, then was number two for three weeks. Then it almost did not stop to drop and totalled 16 weeks in the top ten, 21 weeks in the top 50 and 25 weeks on the chart (top 100). As of August 2014, the song was the 21st best-selling single of the 21st century in France, with 559,000 units sold.

Track listings
 CD single
 "Seul" — 4:41
 "Que l'amour est violent" — 5:41
 "L'Adieu" — 4:02

 Digital download
 "Seul" — 4:41
 "Seul" (live)

Charts and sales

Weekly charts

Year-end charts

Certifications

References

External links
 "Seul", lyrics + music video

2000 singles
Garou (singer) songs
Columbia Records singles
Ultratop 50 Singles (Wallonia) number-one singles
SNEP Top Singles number-one singles
Songs written by Romano Musumarra
Songs with lyrics by Luc Plamondon
2000 songs